This is a list of events in Scottish television from 1969.

Events

January to August
No events.

September 
Reporting Scotland is integrated into the networked Nationwide strand.

October 
Scottish Television starts broadcasting in colour.
Secondary studios for Scottish Television open at the Gateway Theatre on Leith Walk in Edinburgh.

November 
3 November – A serious fire puts Scottish Television's main studio, Studio A, out of action.

December 
No events.

Television series
Scotsport (1957–2008)
Dr. Finlay's Casebook (1962–1971)
The Adventures of Francie and Josie (1962–1970)
Reporting Scotland (1968–1983; 1984–present)

Births
28 March - Laurie Brett, actress
24 April - Rory McCann, actor
8 May - Michael E. Rodgers, actor
15 May - Craig Oliver, journalist, media executive and British government Director of Communications
10 August - Ashley Jensen, actress
5 September - Tom Vaughan, film and television director
13 November - Gerard Butler, actor
13 December - Tony Curran, actor
30 December - Kathleen MacInnes, singer, actress and television presenter
Unknown - Tom Cowan, football journalist
Unknown - Heather Reid, meteorologist and weather presenter

See also
1969 in Scotland

References

 
Television in Scotland by year
1960s in Scottish television